Fuamah District is one of eight districts located in Bong County, Liberia.

Districts of Liberia
Bong County